Rupert Croft-Cooke (20 June 1903 – 10 June 1979) was an English writer. A prolific creator of fiction and non-fiction, including screenplays and biographies under his own name and detective stories under the pseudonym of Leo Bruce.

Life
The son of Hubert Bruce Cooke, of the London Stock Exchange, and his wife Lucy, a daughter of Dr Alfred Taylor, Rupert Croft-Cooke was born on 20 June 1903, in Edenbridge, Kent, and was educated at Tonbridge School and Wellington College (Shropshire). At the age of seventeen, he was working as a private tutor in Paris. He spent 1923 and 1924 in Buenos Aires, where he founded the journal La Estrella. In 1925 he returned to London and began a career as a freelance journalist and writer, at about this time combining his middle name into his surname. His work appeared in several magazines, including New Writing, Adelphi, and the English Review. In the late 1920s the American magazine Poetry published several of his plays. He was also a radio broadcaster on psychology. In 1929 he became a dealer in antiquarian books, continuing this business until 1931. From 1930 he spent a year in Germany, and in 1931 lectured in English at the Institut Montana Zugerberg in Switzerland. In 1940 he joined the British Army and served in Africa and India until 1946. He later wrote several books about his military experiences. From 1947 to 1953 he was a book reviewer for The Sketch.

Croft-Cooke was a homosexual, which brought him into conflict with the laws of his time. In 1953, at a time when the Home Office was seeking to clamp down on homosexuality, he was sent to prison for six months on conviction for acts of indecency. Croft-Cooke's secretary and companion, Joseph Alexander, had met two Navy cooks, Harold Altoft and Ronald Charles Dennis, in the Fitzroy Tavern near Tottenham Court Road in London, and invited them to spend the weekend at Croft-Cooke's house in Ticehurst, East Sussex. During the weekend, they consumed food and alcohol and had sex with both Croft-Cooke and his assistant. On their way home from the weekend, they got drunk and assaulted two men, one of whom was a policeman. They were arrested and agreed to testify against Croft-Cooke to get immunity from prosecution for the assault charges.

The case of Croft-Cooke was discussed by the Committee who produced the Wolfenden report into changing the law on prostitution and homosexuality, specifically by Philip Allen, a civil servant testifying on behalf of the Home Office. Allen described Croft-Cooke and Alexander as attempting to "interfere" with the sailors, who resisted these advances. Michael Graham-Harrison, a junior Home Office civil servant, attempted to correct Allen's rhetorical overreaching, noting that the sailors were "picked up in a place frequented by homosexuals" and arguing that he did "not think anybody could believe for a moment that they did not know what they were going for".

Croft-Cooke went to Wormwood Scrubs and Brixton Prison and later wrote about the British penal system in The Verdict of You All (1955).

The 1957 war film Seven Thunders was based on his novel. He also wrote for television, including two episodes of Alfred Hitchcock Presents in 1959. He is best known today for the detective stories he wrote under the name of Leo Bruce. His detectives were called Carolus Deene and Sergeant Beef.

From 1953 to 1968 he lived in Morocco, fearing continued persecution in Britain for homosexuality, then moved on to live in Tunisia, Cyprus, West Germany, and Ireland.

Croft-Cooke returned to England in the 1970s and died in 1979, when he was living at 4, Amira Court, Bourne Avenue, Bournemouth. He left an estate valued at £9,297.

Major publications as Rupert Croft-Cooke

 God in Ruins (1936) 
 Darts (1938)
 How to Get More Out of Life (1938)
 Major Road Ahead (ed. 1939)
 The Circus Book (ed. 1947) 
 Rudyard Kipling (1948)
 How to Enjoy Travel Abroad (1948)
 Cities with Noel Barber (1952)
 Buffalo Bill with W.S. Meadmore (1952)
 Sherry (1955) 
 Port (1957)
 Smiling Damned Villain (1959)
 English Cooking, a New Approach (1960)
 Madeira (1961)
 Cooking for Pleasure (1962)
 Wine and Other Drinks (1962; reprinted 1966)
 Bosie: The Story of Lord Alfred Douglas (1963)
 Tales of a Wicked Uncle (1963)
 Feasting With Panthers: A New Consideration of Some Late Victorian Writers (1967) 
 Exotic Food (1969)
 The Unrecorded Life of Oscar Wilde (1972) 
 Circus: A World History with Peter Cotes (1976)
 The Sawdust Ring with W.S. Meadmore (?)

Novels, poetry and plays

 Clouds of Gold [Poetry] 1920)
 Songs of a Sussex Tramp [Poetry] (1922)
 Tonbridge School [Poetry] (1922). Published in aid of the school's War Memorial Fund
 Songs South of the Line [Poetry] (1925)
 The Telegram [Radio play] (1926)
 Twenty Poems from the Spanish of Becquer [Poetry] (1927)
 Some Poems [Poetry] (1929)
 Banquo's Chair [Stage play] (1930)
 Troubador (1930)
 Give Him the Earth (1930)
 Tap Three Times [Stage play] (1931) 
 Night Out (1932)
 Cosmopolis (1932)
 Release the Lions (1933)
 Deliberate Accident [Stage play] (1934)
 Picaro (1934)
 Shoulder the Sky (1934)
 Blind Gunner (1935)
 Crusade (1936)
 Kingdom Come (1936)
 Rule Britannia (1938)
 Pharaoh With His Wagons [Short Stories] (1938)
 Same Way Home (1940)
 Glorious (1940)
 Octopus (1946)
 Ladies Gay (1946)
 Miss Allick (1947)
 Wilkie (1948)
 A Football for the Brigadier and other Stories [Short Stories] (1950)
 Brass Farthing (1950)
 Three Names for Nicholas (1951)
 Nine Days with Edward (1952)
 Harvest Moon (1953)
 Fall of Man (1955)
 Seven Thunders (1955)
 A Few Gypsies [Short Stories] (1955)
 Barbary Night (1958)
 Thief (1961)
 Clash by Night (1962)
 Paper Albatross (1965)
 St George for England [Poetry] (1966)
 Three in a Cell (1968)
 Wolf From the Door (1969)
 Exiles (1970)
 While the Iron's Hot (1971)
 Under the Rose Garden (1971)
 Nasty Piece of Work (1973)
 Conduct Unbecoming (1975)

'The Sensual World' - Series of Autobiography
 The Moon in My Pocket (1948)
 The Life for Me (1952)
 The Blood-Red Island (1953)
 The Verdict of You All (1955)
 The Tangerine House (1956)
 The Gardens of Camelot (1959)
 The Altar in the Loft (1960)
 The Drums of Morning (1961)
 The Glittering Pastures (1962)
 The Numbers Came (1963)
 The Last of Spring (1964)
 The Wintry Sea (1964)
 The Gorgeous East (1965)
 The Purple Streak (1966)
 The Wild Hills (1966)
 The Happy Highways (1967)
 The Ghost of June (1968)
 The Sound of Revelry (1969)
 The Licentious Soldiery (1971) 
 The Dogs of Peace (1973)
 The Caves of Hercules (1974)
 The Long Way Home (1974)
 The Green, Green Grass (1977)

Supplementary
 The World is Young (1937)
 The Man in Europe Street (1938)
 The Circus Has No Home (1941)
 The Quest for Quixote (1959)

Short stories
 The Appointed Key. Reynold’s Newspaper, 31 January 1932
 The Legacy. Pearson's Weekly, 2 April 1932
 An Eye for an Eye. Everybody's Weekly, 25 June 1932
 Politeness Pays. Everybody's Weekly, 10 December 1932
 Mr Smith's Hallucinations. Daily Herald, 25 December 1933
 Seat 116. Pearson's Weekly, 5 May 1934
 Publicity. Daily Herald, 8 November 1934
 Headlines. Everybody's Weekly, 11 August 1936
 Termination 2. Melbourne Herald, 11 February 1937, as Rupert Croft-Cook
 The Uninvited Guest. Everybody's Weekly, 10 May 1938
 The Late Mr Trilbert. The Sketch, 5 July 1939
 Combat. Falkirk Herald, 3 January 1940, Reprinted in Linlithgowshire Gazette, 5 January 1940
 Grandmother Smith. John Bull, 27 January 1951
 The Line Went Dead. The Tatler, 21 December 1960

Poetry
 ... She that is Heaven's Queen .... Blackfriars, October 1926
 In Snow. Blackfriars, October 1927
 Downstairs. Poetry, July 1928
 That Pueblo. Poetry, July 1928
 Three Miles from Tilbury. Poetry, July 1928

Short non-fiction
 What the Prince Will See in Chile. Yorkshire Post, 7 September 1925
 South America. Yorkshire Post, 15 October 1930
 The Criminal Mind. Reynolds’ Illustrated News, 3 September 1933
 Freedom for Sale. Northern Daily Mail, 24 November 1934
 Talking about Freedom. Northern Daily Mail, 27 April 1935
 Perils of Philanthropy. Northern Daily Mail, 25 January 1936. Reprinted, Montrose Review, 7 February 1936
 A Protest against Placards. Northern Daily Mail, 26 September 1936
 The Tyranny of Uniforms. (Portsmouth) Evening News, 17 September 1937. Reprinted: Motherwell Times, 22 October 1937
 Freedom on the Continent. Linlithgowshire Gazette, 15 April 1938
 Is He Trying to Make You Furious?? Daily Mirror, 21 May 1938
 The Man in Europe Street. Midland Daily Telegraph, 11 October 1938
 I’m Tired of Being Treated Like a Child. Illustrated Leicester Chronicle, 17 June 1939
 Freedom is in Danger. Falkirk Herald, 28 February 1940. Reprinted: Northern Daily Mail, 25 March 1940
 Paradise for Busybodies. Falkirk Herald, 18 June 1941
 Freedom of the Seas. Dumfries and Galloway Standard & Advertiser, 17 December 1941. Also published: Falkirk Herald, 17 December 1941
 Living in a Tent. Dumfries and Galloway Standard & Advertiser, 1 July 1944
 The Lesser Freedom. Dumfries and Galloway Standard & Advertiser, 12 May 1945
 The Tyranny of Time. Northern Daily Mail, 20 December 1945
 H E Bates. The Sketch, 21 May 1952
 Tom Thumb: The Midget Who Made a Fortune. The World's News, 17 October 1953

Major publications as Leo Bruce
Under the name of Leo Bruce, one series of novels featured Sergeant Beef, a British police officer; a second featured Carolus Deene, senior history master at the fictional Queen's School, Newminster, as an amateur detective.

Novels

Sergeant Beef series
 Case for Three Detectives (1936) : An example of the locked room type of murder mystery, this book spoofs three famous fictional detectives, Lord Peter Wimsey, as Lord Simon Plimsoll, Hercule Poirot as Monsieur Amer Picon, and Father Brown, under the name of Monsignor Smith. Repr Academy Chicago Publishers, 1980; Chicago Review Press, 2005.
 Case Without a Corpse (1937)
 Case With No Conclusion (1939)
 Case With Four Clowns (1939). Repr Academy Chicago Publishers, 2010.
 Case With Ropes and Rings (1940). Repr Chicago Review Press, 2019.
 Case For Sergeant Beef (1947)
 Neck and Neck (1951). Repr Academy Chicago Publishers, 2019.
 Cold Blood (1952). Repr Academy Chicago Publishers, 2019.
 Murder in Miniature: The Short Stories of Leo Bruce (Ed. B.A. Pike). Academy Chicago Publishers, 1992.

Short stories
A Stiff Drink Aberdeen Evening Express, 12 April 1938. Collected in ‘’Murder in Miniature’’
Clue in the Mustard Evening Standard, 24 March 1950. Collected in ‘’Murder in Miniature’’
Holiday Task Evening Standard, 16 May 1950. Collected in ‘’Murder in Miniature’’
Murder in Miniature Evening Standard, 6 September 1950. Collected in ‘’Murder in Miniature’’
The Doctor's Wife Evening Standard, 11 October 1950. Collected in ‘’Murder in Miniature’’
Beef and the Spider Evening Standard, 18 November 1950. Collected in ‘’Murder in Miniature’’
Summons to Death. Collected in ‘’Murder in Miniature’’
The Chicken and the Egg. To be confirmed, 29 June 1951. Collected in ‘’Murder in Miniature’’
On the Spot (Inspector Simler story). Collected in ‘’Murder in Miniature’’
Blunt Instrument. To be confirmed, 20 August 1951. Collected in ‘’Murder in Miniature’’
I, Said the Sparrow. Collected in ‘’Murder in Miniature’’
A Piece of Paper Evening Standard, 28 January 1952. Collected in ‘’Murder in Miniature’’
Letter of the Law (Abel Ziccary story) Evening Standard, 30 September 1952. Collected in ‘’Murder in Miniature’’
A Glass of Sherry Evening Standard, October 1952. Collected in ‘’Murder in Miniature’’
The Scene of the Crime Evening Standard, October 1952. Collected in ‘’Murder in Miniature’’
Murder in Reverse Evening Standard, December 1952. Collected in ‘’Murder in Miniature’’
Woman in the Taxi Evening Standard, January 1953. Collected in ‘’Murder in Miniature’’
The Nine-Fifty-Five Evening Standard, 17 February 1953. Collected in ‘’Murder in Miniature’’
Person or Persons Evening Standard, March 1953. Collected in ‘’Murder in Miniature’’
The Wrong Moment Evening Standard, March 1953. Collected in ‘’Murder in Miniature’’
A Box of Capsules Evening Standard, April 1953. Collected in ‘’Murder in Miniature’’
Blind Witness Evening Standard, April 1953. Collected in ‘’Murder in Miniature’’
Deceased Wife's Sister Evening Standard, April 1953. Collected in ‘’Murder in Miniature’’
Riverside Night Evening Standard, April 1953. Collected in ‘’Murder in Miniature’’
Rufus - and the Murderer. (London) Evening Standard, 24 August 1955. Collected in ‘’Murder in Miniature’’
The Marsh Light. Collected in ‘’Murder in Miniature’’
Into Thin Air. Collected in ‘’Murder in Miniature’’
A Case for the Files. Collected in ‘’Murder in Miniature’’ 
Beef for Christmas. The Tatler, 8 November 1957. Reprinted in Silent Nights - Christmas Mysteries (Ed. Martin Edwards)
The Inverness Cape. Reprinted in Bodies from the Library Volume 1 (Ed. Tony Medawar)
 Rigor Mortis. First published in Bodies from the Library. Volume 4 (Ed. Tony Medawar)

Carolus Deene series 
 At Death’s Door (1955)
 Death of Cold (1956)
 Dead for a Ducat (1956)
 Dead Man’s Shoes (1958). Repr Academy Chicago Publishers, 1987.
 A Louse for the Hangman (1958)
 Our Jubilee Is Death (1959). Repr Academy Chicago Publishers, 1986.
 Furious Old Women (1960). Repr Academy Chicago Publishers, 1983.
 Jack on the Gallows Tree (1960)
 Die All, Die Merrily (1961). Repr Academy Chicago Publishers, 1987.
 A Bone and a Hank of Hair (1961) Repr Academy Chicago Publishers, 1985.
 Nothing Like Blood (1962)
 Such Is Death (1963). Repr Academy Chicago Publishers, 1986.
 Death in Albert Park (1964)
 Death at Hallows End (1965) (reprinted in paperback by Academy Chicago Publishers, May 2008)
 Death on the Black Sands (1966)
 Death of a Commuter (1967). Repr Academy Chicago Publishers, 1988.
 Death at St. Asprey’s School (1967). Repr Academy Chicago Publishers, 1984.
 Death on Romney Marsh (1968)
 Death with Blue Ribbon (1969). Repr Academy Chicago Publishers, 1994.
 Death on Allhallowe’en (1970). Repr Academy Chicago Publishers, 1988.
 Death by the Lake (1971)
 Death in the Middle Watch (1974). Repr Academy Chicago Publishers, 2004.
 Death of a Bovver Boy (1974). Repr Academy Chicago Publishers, 2014.

Further reading

Archival sources
Rupert Croft-Cooke collection, 1930-1974 (4.5 linear feet) are housed at the Howard Gotlieb Archival Research Center at Boston University.
Rupert Croft-Cooke Papers, 1956-1977 (1 linear foot) are housed at the Washington State University Libraries.
Rupert Croft-Cooke collection at Exeter University Library Special Collections Department including newspaper cuttings, photographs and personal letters from 1920's to 1970's.
Reading University Special collections archive
Harry Ransom centre University of Texas at Austin.
The Exeter University archive website also mentions several archives which hold material regarding Rupert Croft-Cooke: "University of Reading; Bodleian Library; University of Durham; University of Oxford; BBC Written Archives Centre; University of Texas (Harry Ransom Center, Austin), ..."

Bibliography
Murder Will Out: The Detective in Fiction, T. J. Binyon (Oxford, 1989)  pp. 54,123

References

External links
Rupert Croft-Cooke  at croft-cooke.co.uk

1903 births
1979 deaths
20th-century English male writers
People educated at Tonbridge School
People educated at Wellington College, Berkshire
People from Edenbridge, Kent
Intelligence Corps soldiers
British Army personnel of World War II
English LGBT writers
British gay writers
20th-century English non-fiction writers
English mystery writers
English expatriates in Morocco
People from Ticehurst
English biographers
People convicted for homosexuality in the United Kingdom
20th-century English LGBT people
Military personnel from Kent